The Lion and Leopard Hunt or The Lion Hunt is a painting by Peter Paul Rubens, now held in the Gemäldegalerie Alte Meister in Dresden, Germany. It is very similar to his The Tiger Hunt from the Museum of Fine Arts of Rennes and its dating is debated.

Notes

Bibliography
 Arnout Balis, Hunting Scenes, vol. 2, Oxford University Press and Harvey Miller Ltd, coll. « Corpus Rubenianum Ludwig Burchard », 1986, 406 p., part XVIII
 David Rosand, "Rubens's Munich Lion Hunt: Its Sources and Significance", The Art Bulletin, College Art Association, vol. 51, no 1, March 1969, p. 29-40

1610s paintings
Paintings by Peter Paul Rubens
Collections of the Gemäldegalerie Alte Meister
Lions in art
Hunting in art